Cooltong is a local name north west of Renmark in South Australia. It may refer to
 Cooltong, South Australia, a town
 Cooltong Conservation Park
and several other geographic and cultural features.